The Mi'gmawei Mawiomi Secretariat is a political organization and a tribal council representing the Mi'gmaq people of Gespe’gewa’gi, the 7th district of Mi'gma'gi, the national territory of the Mi'kmaq. The territory of Gespe’gewa’gi includes eight Mi'gmaq communities. The tribal council of Mi'gmawei Mawiomi is composed of three Indian bands: Gesgapegiag, Gespeg and Listuguj. Together the three bands has a cumulative registered population of 6,295 members in 2016. The organization is headquartered at Listuguj.

In 2007, Mi'gmawei Mawiomi delivered a declaration titled  ("Our Territory: We never gave it and We never left it") to the governments of Canada and Quebec.

List of bands
Three Indian bands are part of the tribal council of Mi'gmawei Mawioni Secretariat.

See also
 Grand Council (Mi'kmaq)

References

External links
 Official website
 Tribal Council Detail by Indigenous and Northern Affairs Canada

Gaspé Peninsula
Mi'kmaq in Canada
First Nations governments in Quebec